Melchioria is a genus of fungi within the Niessliaceae family.

The genus was circumscribed by Albert Julius Otto Penzig and Pier Andrea Saccardo in Malpighia vol.11 on page 399 in 1897.

The genus name of Melchioria is in honour of Melchior Treub (1851–1910), who was a Dutch botanist. He worked at the Bogor Botanical Gardens in Buitenzorg on the island of Java, south of Batavia, Dutch East Indies, gaining renown for his work on tropical flora.

Species
As accepted by Species Fungorum;
Melchioria calospora 
Melchioria leucomelaena 
Melchioria maeshimana 
Melchioria philippinensis 
Melchioria pseudosasae 
Melchioria tengii

References

External links 

 Melchioria at Index Fungorum

Sordariomycetes genera
Niessliaceae
Taxa named by Pier Andrea Saccardo